Andrzej Magowski (7 July 1966 – 28 October 2022) was a Polish footballer who played as a midfielder.

Career
Magowski started his career in Bydgoszcz with BKS Bydgoszcz. It is not known how long he spent with BKS, but it is known that he moved to Polonia Bydgoszcz in 1985, aged 19. After four seasons with Polonia, Magowski joined Elana Toruń for a season, before securing a transfer to I liga side Olimpia Poznań.

During his first spell with Olimpia, he made a total of 43 top flight appearances for the club over two and a half seasons. Over the winter break he joined struggling Igloopol Dębica, but was unable to help them, being relegated in his 14 appearances for the club. As a result, Magowski was relegated with both teams he played for during the 1992–93 season, Olimpia from the I liga and Igloopol from the II liga. Magowski returned to Olimpia over the summer and spent the following season with Olimpia in the II liga, making a further 25 appearances for the club and scored 3 goals as Olimpia went on to win the league.

Despite being promoted the previous season with Olimpia, Magowski joined city rivals Warta Poznań for the start of the 1994–95 season. As the season progressed it was clear that Magowski was going to have another relegation on his record, and opted to rejoin Olimpia towards the end of the season. He made 26 appearances for Warta, and a further 5 for Olimpia that season, with Warta finishing bottom of the I liga. At the start of the 1995–96 season Olimpia Poznań were involved in a merger with Lechia Gdańsk creating the Olimpia-Lechia Gdańsk team, and with the team playing in the city of Gdańsk. Magowski made one appearance for Olimpia-Lechia before opting to move to Germany for the next four seasons.

Magowski initially joined VfL Herzlake in Germany, having an impressive first season, and finishing as the club's top goalscorer with ten goals. Despite the impressive start in Germany for Magowski, he only managed nine appearances the following season, and joined VfL Osnabrück where he struggled even more, making only three appearances the whole season. He returned to VfL Herzlake for one last season, making 26 appearances and scoring 5 goals, to take his total in Germany for the four seasons to 70 league appearances and 16 goals. He returned to Poland, playing his final season with Pomerania Police before retiring in 2000. In total he made 75 appearances in Poland's top division scoring 4 goals.

Post-playing life and death
After his playing career he held roles in a managerial position with clubs such as; Start Radziejów, Pomowiec Kijewo, Mień Lipno, Unia Solec Kujawski, and Dąb Barcin. In 2013 he became a coordinator of the Kuyavian-Pomeranian Football Association.

Magowski died on 28 October 2022, at the age of 56.

Honours
Olimpia Poznań
 II liga (Western group): 1993–94

References

1966 births
2022 deaths
Sportspeople from Bydgoszcz
Polish footballers
Association football midfielders
Polonia Bydgoszcz players
Elana Toruń players
Olimpia Poznań players
Igloopol Dębica players
Warta Poznań players
Lechia Gdańsk players
VfL Herzlake players
VfL Osnabrück players
KP Chemik Police players
Polish expatriate footballers
Polish expatriate sportspeople in Germany
Expatriate footballers in Germany